Metehara Sugar (aka Metehara Seqwar) is an Ethiopian football club, in the town of Addis Ketema, Oromia Region. Despite their name, they are not based in Metehara, nor do they have any current affiliation with the sugar mill. They play in the Ethiopian Premier League, the top level of professional football in Ethiopia.

References

External links 
 Premier League 2006/07 (rankings)

Football clubs in Ethiopia